is a subway station in Chūō, Tokyo, Japan operated by the Tokyo subway operator Toei Subway. It serves the lower part of the Tsukiji district, including the enormous Tokyo Metropolitan Central Wholesale Market, the Tokyo headquarters of the Asahi Shimbun newspaper, and Japan's National Cancer Center.

Lines 
Tsukijishijō Station is served by the Toei Ōedo Line, and is numbered E-18.

Station layout
The station consists of an underground island platform serving two tracks.

Platforms

History
The station opened on 12 December 2000.

Surrounding area
 Tsukiji fish market
 Asahi Shimbun
 Japan National Cancer Center
 Hamarikyu Gardens
 Tsukiji Hongan-ji
 Shiodome

See also

 List of railway stations in Japan

References

External links

 Toei station information 

Railway stations in Tokyo
Railway stations in Japan opened in 2000
Stations of Tokyo Metropolitan Bureau of Transportation
Toei Ōedo Line
Tsukiji